Fantastic Four (credited onscreen as The Fantastic Four) is an American animated television series produced by Hanna-Barbera Productions and based on the Marvel Comics superhero team of the same name. The program, featuring character designs by Alex Toth, aired Saturday mornings on ABC from September 9, 1967, to September 21, 1968. It lasted for 20 episodes, with repeat episodes airing on ABC for three years until the network cancelled the program. It was also rerun as part of the continuing series Hanna–Barbera's World of Super Adventure.

The show was followed by another Fantastic Four cartoon produced by DePatie–Freleng Enterprises, The New Fantastic Four, in 1978.

Plot
In the show, the super-team battles some of their comic book nemeses, including Dr. Doom, the Mole Man and Diablo.

Voice cast

Credited cast
 Gerald Mohr - Mister Fantastic / Reed Richards
 Jo Ann Pflug - Invisible Girl / Susan Storm Richards
 Paul Frees - The Thing / Benjamin J. Grimm, Uatu the Watcher, Additional Voices
 Jac Flounders - Human Torch / Johnny Storm, Mole Man

Notable guest stars
 Tol Avery - Warlord Morrat
 Ted Cassidy - Galactus
 Henry Corden - Attuma, Molecule Man
 Regis Cordic - Diablo
 Frank Gerstle - Blastaar
 Don Messick -  Kurrgo, Skrull Emperor
 Marvin Miller - Super-Skrull, King Toth
 Vic Perrin - Red Ghost, Silver Surfer, Professor Gamma/The Demon
 Mike Road - Prince Triton, Rama-Tut
 Joseph Sirola - Dr. Doom
 Hal Smith - Judge, Klaw, Otto Von Lenz
 Ginny Tyler - Anelle
 Janet Waldo - Lady Dorma, Princess Perla

Episodes

Reception
In The Encyclopedia of American Animated Television Shows, David Perlmutter writes, "While Hanna-Barbera was, because of obvious production restrictions, unable to duplicate Lee and Kirby's complex, labyrinthine plotting from the comics, their 1967 adaptation of the Four was well produced in every other respect, and gave the team welcome exposure to those previously unfamiliar with their comic-book existence. The voice actors were unusually well cast, with Frees' Brooklyn-accented Thing standing out, and this helped compensate for the limitations of the animation process of the time. Unfortunately, the erroneous concerns about violence in the mass media ultimately marginalized the series, as it did others from the same time period."

Translations
In Japan, the series was known as Space Ninja Gohms（Uchu Ninja Gohmuzu）().

See also
 List of works produced by Hanna-Barbera Productions
 List of Hanna-Barbera characters

References

External links

Marvel Animation Age: Fantastic Four (1967) 
Fantastic Four at the Big Cartoon DataBase
International Hero: Fantastic Four
Pazsaz - synopsis and episode guide

1967 American television series debuts
1968 American television series endings
1960s American animated television series
American Broadcasting Company original programming
American children's animated action television series
American children's animated adventure television series
American children's animated science fantasy television series
American children's animated superhero television series
Fantastic Four television series
Television shows based on Marvel Comics
Animated television series based on Marvel Comics
Television series by Hanna-Barbera
Hanna-Barbera superheroes